Clarks is an unincorporated community in Cass Township, Pulaski County, in the U.S. state of Indiana.

Geography

References

Unincorporated communities in Pulaski County, Indiana
Unincorporated communities in Indiana